Rudki  is a village in the administrative district of Gmina Szydłów, within Staszów County, Świętokrzyskie Voivodeship, in south-central Poland.

The village has a population of  296.

Demography 
According to the 2002 Poland census, there were 289 people residing in Rudki village, of whom 53.3% were male and 46.7% were female. In the village, the population was spread out, with 26% under the age of 18, 35.3% from 18 to 44, 19% from 45 to 64, and 19.7% who were 65 years of age or older.
 Figure 1. Population pyramid of village in 2002 — by age group and sex

References

Villages in Staszów County